The Colorado State Rams women's basketball team represents Colorado State University, located in Fort Collins, in the U.S. state of Colorado, in NCAA Division I basketball competition. They play their home games at the Moby Arena and are members of the Mountain West Conference. They are led by head coach Ryun Williams.

History
They have made the NCAA Tournament six times, in 1996, 1998, 1999, 2001, 2002, and 2016. They made the Sweet Sixteen in 1999 after beating CS Northridge 71–59 and SW Mo. State 86–70 before losing to UCLA 77–68. They made the Second Round in 1996, 1998, and 2001. They also have made the WNIT in 2000, 2003, 2004, 2014, 2015, and 2022 with Semifinal appearances in 2000 and 2003.

NCAA tournament results

References

External links
 

 
1974 establishments in Colorado